Van Buren Township is the name of eleven townships in Indiana:

 Van Buren Township, Brown County, Indiana
 Van Buren Township, Clay County, Indiana
 Van Buren Township, Daviess County, Indiana
 Van Buren Township, Fountain County, Indiana
 Van Buren Township, Grant County, Indiana
 Van Buren Township, Kosciusko County, Indiana
 Van Buren Township, LaGrange County, Indiana
 Van Buren Township, Madison County, Indiana
 Van Buren Township, Monroe County, Indiana
 Van Buren Township, Pulaski County, Indiana
 Van Buren Township, Shelby County, Indiana

See also
Van Buren Township (disambiguation)

Indiana township disambiguation pages